Sturefors is a locality situated in Linköping Municipality, Östergötland County, Sweden with 2,229 inhabitants in 2010.

History 
Sturefors was called Husby till 1940. Husby was named Sturefors after Sturefors station and railway station. Sturefors, located in the valley of Stångån between Linköping-Åtvidaberg-Västervik and Linköping-Kisa-Vimmerby-Kalmar railway lines.

References

External links 

Populated places in Östergötland County
Populated places in Linköping Municipality